Rahimabad (also Romanized as Raḩīmābād) is a village in Faragheh Rural District, in the Central District of Abarkuh County, Yazd Province, Iran. At the 2006 census, its population was 205, in 57 families.

References 

Populated places in Abarkuh County